Idol (Cyrillic: Идол) was a reality TV contest produced in Belgrade, Serbia and aired from 2003 until 2005.

Based on the popular British show Pop Idol, it was its local version for young singing hopefuls in the then still existing state union of Serbia and Montenegro. For the second season, Macedonia was added to the mix as well.

Being referred to unofficially as Srpski Idol (Serbian Idol) or Idol SCG in season one, it was considered as Balkan Idol during its second season because of the adding of Skopje as the audition destination resulting in a number of Macedonian contestants making it into the top 12, however throughout the entire running of the series its official name remained Idol only.

Hosted by Dejan Pantelić, the programme aired on Serbia's BKTV network from late 2003 until May 2005. During that time two seasons were produced, however BKTV decided not to buy the licence for the third one due to financial problems.

In 2010, the first season of Macedonian Idol started, only for Macedonia.

Auditions
For the first Idol series 4 audition were held in the following cities in Serbia and Montenegro:
Belgrade
Podgorica
Novi Sad
Niš

The second Idol series of added Skopje to the audition tour.

Idol Jury
Saša Dragić – composer & PR manager.
Petar Janjatović – Dallas Records director.
Biljana Bakić – BMG Poland director.
Mirko Vukomanović – music producer.

Finals elimination chart

Season 1
Themes:
February 4: My Idol
February 11: Disco Night
February 18: Serbian Hits
February 25: Film Songs
March 3: Ballads
March 10: Live Band
March 17: Up Tempo / Slow
March 25: Judge's Choice
March 31: Grand Finale

Season 2
Themes:
February 26: My Idol
March 5: Disco Night
March 12: Film Songs
March 19: Latino Hits
March 26: Serbian Hits
April 2: Love Songs
April 9: MTV Ultimate
April 16: Rock'N'Roll
April 26: Up Tempo / Slow
May 5: Judge's Choice
May 12: Grand Finale

External links
Cveta Majtanović za 18. rođendan dobila titulu „Idola“ Prvo škola, a posle karijera, Blic, April 2, 2004

Idols (franchise)
Serbian talent shows
Television series by Fremantle (company)
2003 Serbian television series debuts
2005 Serbian television series endings
2000s Serbian television series
Non-British television series based on British television series
RTV BK Telecom original programming